Boostan, formerly exhibited as Carpet to the Throne, is a Persian carpet woven by Master Ali Khodadadi and is considered to be a masterpiece in the history of Persian art.

About Boostan 
Master Khodadadi began the work of designing and weaving Boostan in March 1978.  The design was described and dictated by Mr. Khodadadi and drawn by the late Master Archang Esfahani over the course of two months.  Weaving began with a pile 7 centimeters thick (wool strands 7 centimeters long) and was completed in October 1979.  The most important stage, and that which contributed the most to the artistic value of the carpet, the scissors work, was begun in November 1979 and completed in January 1986.

Boostan is referenced in The Dream of Paradise, a set of three books describing the most famous carpets in the world.  In this reference collection, Boostan is listed among 115 internationally renowned pieces of art, including the Pazyryk carpet, considered to be the world's most antique carpet, woven in the 5th century B.C.  

The following is a description of the design of Boostan, as cited in The Dream of Paradise:

Technical specifications 
Name Boostan ("Garden of Eternal Spring")
Design Abbasi's Spandrel and Medallion
Dimensions 230 x 150 centimeters
Fibers Merino wool, silk, linen
Knot used Persian
Number of knots 3,800,000

Boostan in the media 
Master Khodadadi's carpet has been "recognized across the world as an [unrivaled] piece of art work."  Boostan was presented to and enjoyed a four-day presence in the Islamic Consultative Assembly (Iranian Parliament), as well as having been exhibited in many different countries, including Japan, Germany, Qatar, Kuwait, and France.  In addition, Boostan won first place at a carpet exhibition in Qatar in 1992, an exhibition in Hannover, Germany in 1992, and a carpet fair in Japan in 1998.

Boostan has been revered by many leading figures in Iran, including Ayatollah Khamenei (Supreme Leader), former President Khatami, and Dr. Hossein Elahi Ghomshei.  It has been said that Master Khodadadi "linked the carpet to the heavens and rendered [from] the heavens the manifestation of beauty"  and that Boostan is "a golden sheet in the history of Persian culture and art."

References

External links 
 Boostan Website (in English and Persian)
 Boostan on the Persian Carpet Association website (in Persian)

Persian rugs and carpets
Individual rugs and carpets